Henno Haava (born 4 February 1973) is an Estonian athletics competitor.

He was born in Tartu. In 1998 he graduated from Berea College in USA.

He started his sporting exercising in 1985, coached by badminton coach Mart Siliksaar. Since 1988 he exercised in athletics, coached by Taivo Mägi. In 1997 he finished 4th at Detroit Marathon. He is multiple-times Estonian champion in different running disciplines. He has been a member of Estonian national athletics team.

Personal best:
 1500 m: 3.53,62 (1993)
 3000 m: 8.11,0 (1994)
 5000 m: 14.17,28 (1994)
 10 000 m: 30.24,15 (1996)
 half marathon: 1:06.03 (1993)
 marathon: 2:18.34 (1999)

References

Living people
1973 births
Estonian male long-distance runners
Estonian male marathon runners
Berea College alumni
Sportspeople from Tartu